The Bybee–Howell House is a historic house, located on Sauvie Island (in the Columbia River), Oregon, United States. It is listed on the National Register of Historic Places. As of 2010, it is part of Howell Territorial Park, administered by the Metro regional government.

References

External links

 The Bybee House on Sauvie's Island, from the Historic American Buildings Survey at the Library of Congress

Houses on the National Register of Historic Places in Oregon
National Register of Historic Places in Multnomah County, Oregon
Houses completed in 1856
Houses in Multnomah County, Oregon
Neoclassical architecture in Oregon
Sauvie Island
1856 establishments in Oregon Territory